Zillimata is a genus of spiders in the family Zodariidae. It was first described in 1995 by Jocqué. , it contains only one species, Zillimata scintillans, found in Australia.

References

Zodariidae
Monotypic Araneomorphae genera
Spiders of Australia